Giuseppe Cipriani (born 9 June 1965) is an Italian racing driver and entrepreneur. He has raced in such series as Auto GP and Formula Palmer Audi. He is also the managing director of Cipriani S.A., an international operator of high-end hotels and restaurants.

Racing record

Complete Auto GP results
(key) (Races in bold indicate pole position) (Races in italics indicate fastest lap)

‡ Position when season was cancelled.

Complete World Series Formula V8 3.5 results
(key) (Races in bold indicate pole position) (Races in italics indicate fastest lap)

† Driver did not finish, but was classified as he completed over 90% of the race distance.

References

External links
 
 
 

1966 births
Living people
Sportspeople from Venice
Italian racing drivers
Sports car racing team owners
Italian Formula Three Championship drivers
Formula Palmer Audi drivers
Auto GP drivers
Superstars Series drivers
Barber Pro Series drivers
World Series Formula V8 3.5 drivers
International GT Open drivers
Durango drivers
Campos Racing drivers
Audi Sport drivers
Team Lazarus drivers